Bernard Parker (born 16 March 1986) is a South African professional association footballer who plays as a midfielder or forward for Premier Soccer League club TS Galaxy. Between 2007 and 2015 he made 73 appearances for the South Africa national team scoring 23 goals.

Parker started his professional football career playing for Thanda Royal Zulu in the Premier Soccer League, where he made 70 appearances before a one year loan to Serbian side Red Star Belgrade. He joined Eredivisie side FC Twente in 2009, where he spent a season and a half before being loaned out to Panserraikos in the Greek Super League. During his time in the Eredivisie, Parker won the 2009-10 Eredivisie and the 2010 Johan Cruyff Shield.

He moved to Kaizer Chiefs in 2011. He was awarded the 2013–14 Lesley Manyathela Golden Boot and won two league titles, the Nedbank Cup and the MTN 8 with the South African club. Parker was released by Kaizer Chiefs in June 2022 after spending over a decade at the club, making over 350 appearances and scoring over 60 goals.

Early life
Parker was born and grew up in Reiger Park, a township next to Boksburg, Gauteng. He was quite good in a variety of sports and excelled in short and long-distance running as well as achieving Eastern Gauteng colours in swimming.

Club career
A product of the School of Excellence, Parker made his debut in the professional ranks for Cape Town's Hellenic FC, later bought and renamed Benoni Premier United. After the club was once again renamed and moved to Durban he remained with Thanda Royal Zulu F.C. until early 2009 when he obtained a transfer to European Cup Winners Red Star in Serbia. His stay in Belgrade was cut short after reports that the club had cash flow problems and owed its players' salaries.

Parker signed with FC Twente in July 2009 and was a member of the team that won the Dutch 2009–10 Eredivisie. After Twente manager Steve McClaren's move to Bundesliga, Parker failed to convince new coach Michel Preud'homme of his qualities and thus spent the first half of the 2010–11 Dutch season mostly on the bench. He joined Leicester City on trial in December 2010 with a view to a permanent move away from the Dutch club. On 18 January 2011, he moved to Panserraikos F.C. on loan, to secure extra game time and returned to FC Twente after the end of the 2010–11 season.

After receiving interest from Swedish clubs Malmö FF and Helsingborgs IF as well as South Africa's Kaizer Chiefs, Parker chose the latter ahead of the other clubs. In the 2012–13 season, Parker scored 12 league goals in 28 matches and finished as runner up to Katlego Mashego who had 13 and helped Chiefs to a league and cup double. The following season, he won the Lesley Manyathela Golden Boot with 10 goals.

After Parker spent over a decade at Kaizer Chiefs, the club decided not to renew his contract that was to expire on 30 June 2022. He scored over 60 goals in 350 appearances there.

In August 2022 Parker joined TS Galaxy on a two-year contract.

International career
Bernard Parker had his national team debut against Malawi in 2007, scoring his first goal in 2008 against the same team. On 17 June 2009, he scored both goals in a 2–0 win over New Zealand in the 2009 Confederations Cup, and also received the Man of the Match award. He played in 2010 FIFA World Cup representing South Africa but the team was eliminated after group stage. He also played in 2013 African Cup of Nations hosted in South Africa.

On 16 June 2013, Parker scored an own goal in a 2–1 defeat to Ethiopia which ended South Africa's chances of qualifying for the 2014 World Cup. Earlier in the match he had given South Africa a 1–0 lead. Parker also scored by chipping the ball over Víctor Valdés in the 56th minute in a 1–0 shock win over the then-world and European champions Spain at Soccer City, where it won the World Cup in 2010. Parker won the top goalscorer award at the 2014 African Nations Championship with four goals from three group matches.

Personal life
Parker married Wendy Cherry in Ballito, KwaZulu-Natal, on 16 June 2012 at a ceremony attended by 170 guests.

Career statistics

Club

International

Scores and results list South Africa's goal tally first, score column indicates score after each Parker goal.

Honours
FC Twente
Eredivisie: 2009–10
Johan Cruijff Schaal: 2010

Kaizer Chiefs
Premier Soccer League: 2012–13, 2014–15
Nedbank Cup: 2012–13
MTN 8: 2015

Individual
Lesley Manyathela Golden Boot: 2013–14
African Nations Championship Golden Boot: 2014

References

External links
 
 

1986 births
Living people
People from Boksburg
Soccer players from Gauteng
Cape Coloureds
South African soccer players
Association football midfielders
Association football forwards
South Africa international soccer players
South Africa A' international soccer players
2009 FIFA Confederations Cup players
2010 FIFA World Cup players
2013 Africa Cup of Nations players
2014 African Nations Championship players
2015 Africa Cup of Nations players
Serbian SuperLiga players
Eredivisie players
Super League Greece players
Thanda Royal Zulu F.C. players
Kaizer Chiefs F.C. players
Red Star Belgrade footballers
FC Twente players
Panserraikos F.C. players
TS Galaxy F.C. players
South African expatriate soccer players
South African expatriate sportspeople in Serbia
Expatriate footballers in Serbia
South African expatriate sportspeople in the Netherlands
Expatriate footballers in the Netherlands
South African expatriate sportspeople in Greece
Expatriate footballers in Greece